Tiara Patryce Malcom (born January 24, 1983) is an American college basketball coach, who was head women's basketball coach at FIU from 2016 to 2020.

Early life and playing career
After graduating from Caravel Academy in Bear, Delaware in 2001, Malcom attended the University of Delaware and played at forward for the Delaware Fightin' Blue Hens for four years under head coach Tina Martin. As a senior, Malcom was one of three team captains. Malcom averaged 16.4 points and 6.7 rebounds in her senior year of 2004–05 and helped Delaware make the WNIT. 

Malcom, who completed a bachelor's degree in family and community services in 2005, and a Master's in Higher Education Administration in 2011,  played one year of professional basketball for GDESSA, a team in the Portuguese Liga Feminina de Basquetebol located in Barreiro.

Delaware statistics

Source

Coaching career
Malcom returned to the University of Delaware in 2006 to become an assistant coach on Martin's staff. In nine seasons as an assistant coach, Malcom helped Delaware reach a 36–0 record in CAA play in the 2011–12 and 2012–13 seasons combined. The team featured future WNBA Rookie of the Year Elena Delle Donne. While working as assistant coach, Malcom earned a master's degree in educational administration from Delaware in 2011.

On May 13, 2015, Malcom joined Marlin Chinn's staff at FIU as assistant coach. Following Chinn's suspension for sexual harassment of a player, Malcom became acting head coach for the final two regular season games and C-USA Tournament. Malcom went 1–4 as acting coach, with the one win being in the first round of the C-USA Tournament, 61–57 over UTSA.

FIU fired Chinn on March 11, 2016 for a violation of NCAA rules and promoted Malcom to head coach on April 8.

Head coaching record

References

1983 births
Living people
American expatriate basketball people in Portugal
American women's basketball coaches
Basketball coaches from Delaware
Basketball coaches from Maryland
Basketball players from Wilmington, Delaware
Basketball players from Maryland
Delaware Fightin' Blue Hens women's basketball coaches
Delaware Fightin' Blue Hens women's basketball players
FIU Panthers women's basketball coaches
Forwards (basketball)
People from Camp Springs, Maryland
American women's basketball players